The genus Corynorhinus consists of the big-eared bats, or American long-eared bats.  Only three species occur in the genus, all occurring in North America.  Members of this group were previously in the genus Plecotus, the long-eared bats, and were also then called lump-nosed bats.  Populations of these species are generally uncommon and declining.  Two subspecies, the Virginia big-eared bat (C. t. virginianus) and the Ozark big-eared bat (C. t. ingens) are federally endangered.

Species
Corynorhinus species are:

Corynorhinus rafinesquii  Rafinesque's big-eared bat
Corynorhinus mexicanus    Mexican big-eared bat
Corynorhinus townsendii   Townsend's big-eared bat 
C. t. ingens  Ozark big-eared bat (endangered)
C. t. pallescens  western big-eared bat
C. t. townsendii  Townsend's big-eared bat
C. t. virginianus  Virginia big-eared bat (endangered)

Popular culture
Corynorhinus is one of the track listing names in the Batman Begins soundtrack by James Newton Howard and Hans Zimmer.

References

 Nowak, R. M.  1999.  Walker's Mammals of the World, 6th edition.  The Johns Hopkins University Press.  Baltimore, Maryland.  
 Harvey, M.J., J.S. Altenbach, and T.L. Best. 1999. Bats of the United States. Arkansas Game and Fish Commission.

 
Bat genera
Taxa named by Harrison Allen